The 1917 San Diego mayoral election was held on April 3, 1917 to elect the mayor for San Diego. The election became known as the "Smokestacks vs. Geraniums" election because the dominant issue was whether the City's development should focus on planning and beautification or job creation and factories. In the primary election Louis J. Wilde, advocating for "smokestacks", and George Marston, derided as "Geranium George" by his opponents, received the most votes and advanced to the runoff. Wilde was then elected mayor with a majority of the votes.

Candidates
Louis J. Wilde, banker
George Marston, department store owner and mayoral candidate in 1913
Charles H. Bartholomew, retired postmaster

Campaign
Incumbent Mayor Edwin M. Capps declined to run for re-election, leaving an open seat. The main challengers for the open seat were local department store owner and philanthropist George Marston, a Progressive, and banker Louis J. Wilde, a Republican. Also contesting the race was recently retired postmaster Charles Bartholomew.

Marston had previously run for mayor in 1913 advocating for planned expansion of the city and projects that would lead to a beautiful and prosperous city rather focusing on commerce and industry. In the intervening years, he had played a large role in shepherding through the Panama–California Exposition. In the 1917 campaign, Marston once again emphasized planned growth. In his campaign, he advocated for city planning, energy conservation, and building and pollution controls on industrial development. He also supported the growth of the military industry, chiefly the navy and the Marine Corps, since he did not consider this to be industrial growth. Marston's campaign also had the backing of influential city leaders such as John D. Spreckels, E.W. Scripps, and Albert Spalding.

In contrast to Marston, Wilde campaigned on a promise of increased industry in San Diego. He campaigned strongly for the labor vote, arguing that increased industry would lead to good jobs and good wages. Wilde billed himself as the "Smokestack Candidate" and labeled his opponent "Geranium George", giving the election its nickname. Wilde campaigned more aggressively than Marston, for example threatening that if Marston won the Salt Lake Railroad would never arrive in San Diego. Marston often refused to respond to these accusations.

On March 20, 1917, Wilde received the highest number of votes in the primary election, followed by Marston. In the April 3, 1917 runoff between the top-two candidates, Wilde received a majority and was elected mayor.

Primary Election results

General Election results

References

1917
1917 California elections
1917
1917 United States mayoral elections
April 1917 events